Boris Rasevic (born 26 January 1995 in Bosnia and Herzegovina) is a Dutch footballer.

Career

At the age of 18, Rasevic debuted for PEC Zwolle in the Eredivisie, but sustained a serious injury shortly thereafter.

In 2017, he signed for Cincinnati Dutch Lions in the American fourth division. However, the style of play there did not suit him, saying that they "often play the long ball and hardly try to solve anything while playing".  Despite this, he also claimed that American players "simply keep going until the last minute, the words “giving up” are not in their vocabulary".

References

External links
 Boris Rasevic at Soccerway

Dutch footballers
Living people
Association football midfielders
1995 births
Association football forwards
PEC Zwolle players
HHC Hardenberg players
Cincinnati Dutch Lions players
People from Ilidža
Bosnia and Herzegovina emigrants to the Netherlands
Achilles '29 players